Christopher Peter Wheeldon OBE (born 22 March 1973) is an English international choreographer of contemporary ballet.

Life and career
Born in Yeovil, Somerset, to an engineer and a physical therapist, Wheeldon began training to be a ballet dancer at the age of 8. He attended the Royal Ballet School between the ages of 11 and 18. In 1991, Wheeldon joined the Royal Ballet, London; and in that same year, he won the gold medal at the Prix de Lausanne competition. In 1993, at the age of 19, Wheeldon moved to New York City to join the New York City Ballet. Wheeldon was named Soloist in 1998.

Wheeldon began choreographing for the New York City Ballet in 1997, while continuing his career as a dancer.  He retired as a dancer in 2000 in order to focus on his choreography.

In 2001, Wheeldon became the New York City Ballet resident choreographer and first resident artist. He was productive in this position, choreographing a number of much lauded works for the troupe, Polyphonia being the first. He quickly developed a reputation as a talented choreographer, and several other eminent ballet companies, such as the San Francisco Ballet, the Bolshoi Ballet, and the Royal Ballet, London have commissioned dances from him.  As of May, 2003, Wheeldon had composed at least 23 works.

In November 2006 Wheeldon announced the formation of Morphoses/The Wheeldon Company, a transatlantic company with a US base at New York City Center and in the UK at Sadler's Wells Theatre, London.  In its first season, the company performed in Vail, London and New York. Wheeldon completed his tenure as Resident Choreographer of New York City Ballet in February 2008. In 2009 the City Parks Foundation commissioned Wheeldon and contemporary singer/songwriter Martha Wainwright to create a new work.  The piece, entitled "Tears of St. Lawrence," premiered at Central Park SummerStage on 14 and 15 August.  The fifteen-minute ballet, choreographed by Christopher Wheeldon and Edwaard Liang, featured twelve dancers accompanied by live music and song by Wainwright, who sang while intermingling with the dancers. In February, 2010, resigned from Morphoses, which will continue to produce ballets without his name.

An Emmy award-winning fly-on-the-wall TV documentary "Strictly Bolshoi" followed Wheeldon as he became the first Englishman to be invited to create a new work for the prestigious Bolshoi Ballet.

In the June/July 2009 issue of The Advocate, Wheeldon was featured on a list of artists who made the "Forty Under 40" list. Christopher Wheeldon was appointed Artistic Associate of The Royal Ballet in 2012.

In 2011, Wheeldon premiered a full-length ballet "Alice's Adventures in Wonderland" at the Royal Ballet, Covent Garden. This was the first full-length ballet created at the Royal Ballet for over 20 years, and was jointly commissioned with the National Ballet of Canada. The ballet had its world premiere on 28 February 2011 (with Royal Ballet principal Lauren Cuthbertson in the lead role) and featured a brand new score by Joby Talbot.

In 2014, Wheeldon premiered another full-length ballet, The Winter's Tale for the Royal Ballet, Covent Garden based on the Shakespeare play of the same name. It, too, featured a score by Joby Talbot and has been given a generally good review - 'a ballet to keep' says The Daily Telegraph.

Wheeldon was appointed an Officer of the Order of the British Empire (OBE) in the 2016 New Year Honours for "services to promoting the interests and reputation of British classical and theatrical dance worldwide".

In December 2016, Mr Wheeldon premiered his freshly choreographed Nutcracker along with the Joffrey Ballet in Chicago. Instead of the traditional upper class party scene, Wheeldon has opted for a 'shack scene' which will take place in Chicago's south side. Marie will then be introduced to the enchanted world of sweets and foreign places.

On Thursday 6 June 2019, Wheeldon's Cinderella in-the-round with English National Ballet was premiered at the Royal Albert Hall with over 90 dancers, and projections which created the fairytale setting. 

On February 1, 2022 MJ the Musical opened on Broadway. Wheeldon was nominated for Best Direction of a Musical and Best Choreography at the Tony Awards, winning the latter.

In 2023 he was a jury member at Prix de Lausanne ballet competitions.

Personal life

Wheeldon married yoga instructor Ross Rayburn in 2013.  The ceremony took place on Fire Island, NY and was captured in a Vimeo video by Daniel Robinson.

Honors 
 

 Prix de Lausanne, Gold Medal (1991)
 Mae L. Wien Award, School of American Ballet
 Martin E. Segal Award, Lincoln Center, New York City
 London Critics' Circle Award
 American Choreography Award
 Olivier Award

 Dance Magazine Award
 Prix Benois de la Danse–2013, best choreography (Cinderella by Sergei Prokofiev, Dutch National Ballet)
 Prix Benois de la Danse–2015, best choreography (The Winter's Tale by Joby Talbot, The Royal Ballet)
 2015 Tony Award for best choreography 'An American in Paris'
 Times Arts Award for Best Director of A Musical 'An American in Paris"
 Outer Critics Circle Award Best Director of a musical 'An American in Paris' and choreography 'An American in Paris' 
 Broadwayworld.co.uk award for Best Director of a Musical for An American in Paris.
 2022 Tony Awards for best choreography 'MJ the Musical'

See also 
 Morphoses productions

Footnotes

References 
 Carman, Joseph. The evolution of Christopher Wheeldon, Dance Magazine, May, 2003
 Carman, Joseph. "Christopher Wheeldon: Making the Most Out of Both Ballet Worlds," Dance Magazine, November 1996.
 Christopher Wheeldon, NY Times archive

External links 
City Center website
Archive film of Christopher Wheeldon's Rhapsody Fantaisie in 2010 at Jacob's Pillow
Morphoses/The Wheeldon Company website
Sadlers Wells website

! colspan="3" | New York City Ballet
|-

People educated at the Royal Ballet School
Choreographers of The Royal Ballet
Dancers of The Royal Ballet
English choreographers
1973 births
Living people
Prix de Lausanne winners
New York City Ballet soloists
Ballet choreographers
English male ballet dancers
New York City Ballet Diamond Project choreographers
People from Yeovil
National Dance Award winners
Mae L. Wien Young Choreographer Award recipients
Choreographers of New York City Ballet
Fellows of the American Academy of Arts and Sciences
Prix Benois de la Danse winners
Drama Desk Award winners
Tony Award winners
English LGBT entertainers
Gay entertainers
Officers of the Order of the British Empire